The Royal Regalia Museum, previously known as the Royal Regalia Building, is a museum located in the heart of Bandar Seri Begawan, the capital of Brunei. It mainly houses the regalia of the Sultan and the royalty, as well as exhibits related to the commemorations of the Silver and Golden Jubilee celebrations of Sultan Hassanal Bolkiah's rule of Brunei. It was officially opened on 30 September 1992 by the Sultan himself.

History

Since construction began in 1969, about 80% has been completed by 1970. The building complex costed an estimated of B$3.35 million. The building was opened in 1971, originally as Churchill Memorial Building. At that time it was the only museum in the world dedicated to commemorate Winston Churchill, although Brunei was regarded an unlikely place as he had never visited the country. It was commissioned by Sultan Omar Ali Saifuddien III, known to be a great admirer of the British prime minister albeit the Sultan only met him once when he was in London at one time. Apart from the memorial museum, the building also housed an aquarium, then Brunei's historical and cultural centre, the office of the Fisheries Department, and a lecture hall.

The building then had a  bronze statue of Churchill himself posing with the V sign. The statue stood on top of a granite base which had an inscription of a quote by Churchill himself:

The building was converted to the present state in 1992 in conjunction with the silver jubilee celebration of Sultan Hassanal Bolkiah's ascension to the throne as the 29th Sultan of Brunei. The renovation to convert the building took seven months, and the statue of Winston Churchill was removed and put into storage.

Since 2 December 2017, the building has been renamed to the Royal Regalia Museum, in conjunction with the Golden Jubilee Celebration of Sultan Hassanal Bolkiah's ascension to the throne.

Description

The museum building is a large gold-domed structure which is fitted with specially-designed mosaics. It has a semi-circular plan and is covered with plush carpets. Marble has been used extensively in its interior. The main display at the entrance hall is a huge chariot used for the parade carrying the Sultan through the streets of the city on the occasion of his 1992 silver jubilee celebration. A bevy of headless mannequins dressed in traditional attire are displayed in front of the chariot. There is also a second chariot which was used during the 1968 coronation and also during the 1972 Queen's visit to Brunei.

Exhibits include the artifacts that were used for royal ceremonies in the country, the gold and silver ceremonial weaponry, crowns embedded with jewels, and other paraphernalia that formed part of the coronation ceremonies, and ceremonial costumes. There is an exhibit of a golden hand and forearm that the Sultan used as a prop for his chin at his coronation and an ornate crown, as well as exhibits of "documents and treaties" in the Constitutional Gallery.

See also
 List of museums in Brunei

References

Bibliography

External links
 Royal Regalia Museum in Museums Department website 

Museums in Brunei
Buildings and structures in Bandar Seri Begawan